Stanford Airport (Biggerstaff Field)  is a county-owned, public-use airport located one nautical mile (2 km) south of the central business district of Stanford, Judith Basin County, Montana. It is included in the National Plan of Integrated Airport Systems for 2011–2015, which categorized it as a general aviation facility.

Facilities and aircraft 
Stanford Airport covers an area of 133 acres (54 ha) at an elevation of 4,327 feet (1,319 m) above mean sea level. It has two runways: 11/29 is 4,200 by 75 feet (1,280 x 23 m) with an asphalt surface and 7/25 is 1,760 by 100 feet (536 x 30 m) with a turf surface.

For the 12-month period ending July 19, 2011, the airport had 4,300 general aviation aircraft operations, an average of 11 per day. At that time there were 10 single-engine aircraft based at this airport.

See also 
 List of airports in Montana

References

External links 
 Aerial image as of August 1997 from USGS The National Map
 

Airports in Montana
Transportation in Judith Basin County, Montana
Buildings and structures in Judith Basin County, Montana